Shallalat Gardens is the name of the ancient garden located in Alexandria, Egypt. The Shallalat Gardens occupy a large area of the Al Shatby neighborhood.

Parts of the ancient Wall of Alexandria are still present in the gardens.

See also 
 Gardens, Parks and Zoos in Alexandria

Parks in Egypt
Tourist attractions in Alexandria